A World Apart is a 1988 anti-apartheid drama film and directed by Chris Menges and starring Barbara Hershey, David Suchet, Jeroen Krabbé, Paul Freeman, Tim Roth, and Jodhi May. Written by Shawn Slovo, it is based on the lives of Slovo's parents, Ruth First and Joe Slovo.  The film was a co-production between companies from the UK and Zimbabwe, where it was filmed. It features Hans Zimmer's first non-collaborative film score.

The film received acclaim, winning BAFTA Awards for Best Screenplay for Shawn Slovo and Best Supporting Actor for David Suchet, as well as the Special Grand Prize of the Jury at the 1988 Cannes Film Festival.

Plot
Set in Johannesburg in 1963, the film examines the abrupt ending of 13-year-old Molly's blithe childhood when her father, a member of the South African Communist Party, flees into exile. Ostracised by her peers, Molly draws closer to her mother who is part of the campaign against apartheid. Their relationship is challenged by hardship, political intimidation, and the mother's eventual arrest.

The film title references both the gap between the mother and her teenage girl, who fails to grasp why their family is so fixated with events beyond their comfortable white suburb, and another separating this world from that of South Africa's poverty-stricken black townships.

Essentially, the film is a tribute to Ruth First by her daughter and concludes in a moment of epiphany as Molly comes to terms with her mother's activism and understands that she too must play a part in the struggle against racial injustice.

Cast

Reception
A World Apart has an overall approval rating of 89% on Rotten Tomatoes from 9 critics.

The film was placed on 40 critics' top ten lists, making it one of the most acclaimed films of 1988.

Box office
The film made £800,000 at the UK box office.

Awards and nominations

References

External links

1988 films
1980s coming-of-age drama films
1988 independent films
Apartheid films
Atlantic Entertainment Group films
Best Foreign Film Guldbagge Award winners
British coming-of-age drama films
British political drama films
British independent films
Drama films based on actual events
Films scored by Hans Zimmer
Films about families
Films about race and ethnicity
Films about racism
Films directed by Chris Menges
Films set in 1963
Films set in South Africa
Films set in the 1960s
Films shot in Zimbabwe
1980s political drama films
Political films based on actual events
Slovo family
Films about mother–daughter relationships
Zimbabwean drama films
English-language Zimbabwean films
1988 directorial debut films
1988 drama films
Cannes Grand Prix winners
1980s English-language films
1980s British films
Films whose writer won the Best Original Screenplay BAFTA Award
English-language drama films